is a residential district of Toshima, Tokyo, Japan, centered at Mejiro Station of Yamanote Line. The district's name is after Mejiro Fudō, which is one of the Goshiki Fudō.

Mejiro is home to the prestigious Gakushuin University. The university's predecessor was established in 1877 to educate the children of the nobility. Its notable alumni include most members of the present Imperial House of Japan as well as the 59th Prime Minister of Japan Tarō Asō.

Neighborhoods of Tokyo
Districts of Toshima